DJ Sender, born Yevheniy Anatoliyovych Yevtukhov (born June 28, 1984 in Luhansk, Ukraine) is a Ukrainian DJ, music producer, songwriter and singer. He is the owner of Send Records and its sublabels. He is also the founder of the DJFM radio station.

Biography 
Sender was born in Luhansk, Ukraine on June 28, 1984. Sender's father ran a music store in a small Ukrainian town, selling music from around the world during the USSR Iron Curtain.

Career 
Sender began his career as a DJ in 2000. According to the results of Ukrainian interactive rating TopDJ, he was the best DJ of Ukraine of 2004-2005 and 2005-2006. In 2001, Sender launched his own radio show named Bomba on the Power FM radio station. Soon the show moved to the Kiss FM radio station where Sender was the editor of afterhours programmes.

In 2004, his first track "Operator" was released on French vinyl label Executive Records.

His remixes Narcotic Thrust – I Like It (DJ Sender Remix), Full House France, and Sandy W feat. Duane Harden – Love For The Music (DJ Sender, Robbie Rivera Remixes) were played all over Europe and were released on plates with Robbie Rivera and Richard Grey.

In 2004, he has released tracks such as "Kiss You", "Torque" and "Generation (Street Parade Intro)" as a tribute to the Street Parade in Zurich that Sender participated in.

In 2006, Sender launched Send Records label that released tracks from Sender, Noiz, Drive Dealers, Hard Rock Sofa, Jim Pavloff, Konstantin Yoodza, Proff, Topspin, Alex Vives, R-Tem, Alex Kenji, DJ Marbrax, Dabruck & Klein, Dave Robertson, Goshva, Jaimie Fanatic, Laidback Luke, Nino Anthony, Patrik Bjorkman, David Sense. It was the year when Sender took part in Miami Winter Music Conference for the first time.

Including, Ievtukhov started to visit conferences Amsterdam Dance Event and Sochi Winter Music Conference almost every year and sometimes he participates in panels and discussions.

In 2007, Sender focused on the Ukrainian club scene development through his booking agency.

In 2008, Ievtukhov launched DJFM radio station in Kiev first and later in Simferopol. He was its ideologist and creative director. At the same time, Ievtukhov launched DJMAG.UA project and DJ Magazine Ukraine – the Ukrainian version of the world's best known magazine about electronic music.

Vocal career 
The upcoming debut vocal album The Crystals is finished  which includes singles such as “The Crystals”, “Holiday”, “Do It” and “Love”.

In season 2011/2012 track, The Crystals has received the TOPDJ.ua award as The Best House Track.

Events 
Sender has been performing over 12 years and during this time he has played on parties together with Richie Hawtin, Loco Dice, Dubfire, David Guetta, Axwell, Steve Angello, Sebastian Ingrosso, Joachim Garraud, Hard Rock Sofa, Junior Jack and Kid Creme, DJ Antoine, Denis the Menace, Jerry Ropero, DJ Prom, Paolo Mojo, 16 Bit Lolitas and others.

Awards 
2004 – The Best DJ of Ukraine (TOPDJ.ua Awards)
2005 – The Best DJ of Ukraine (TOPDJ.ua Awards)
2005 – The Best DJ #2 of Ukraine (TOPDJ.ua Awards)
2005 – The Best DJ #2 of Ukraine (TOPDJ.ua Awards)
2011 - The Crystals is The Best House Track (TOPDJ.ua Awards)
2011 - The Crystals is The Best Track of the Year (KISSFM Dance Awards)
2011 – The Best House DJ (Showbiza.net Awards)

Discography 
 Sender - Love
 Sender - Holiday
 Sender - The Crystals
 Sender & Pavloff - Your Love (Inc. Tom Budden remix) ALiVE Recordings
 Sender & Pavloff - Hang (DJ Madskillz Remix) Klimaks Recordings
 iO & Sender - Love Trip (Original Mix) / 2010, Noir Music
 Amin Golestan, Marco G - Deadpool (iO & Sender Remix)
 Jim Pavloff - Driver (Sender Remix)
 Sender - Tuner
 DJ Sender - Generation (Street Parade Intro)
 DJ Sender - Torque (Main Vibe)
 DJ Sender - Kiss You
 Angel Stoxx - Isternia (Sender remix)
 Polina Griffith - Justice Of Love (DJ Sender Remix)
 Swanky Tunes & Hard Rock Sofa - Acid Trip (Sender Remix)
 Oliver Moldan - Second Session (DJ Sender Remix)
 D.A. – Su Rap (DJ Sender Vox Mix, DJ Sender Sex Dub) / 2004 ARS, Send
 Taiana – Melt Away (DJ Sender Vocal Mix) / Record RU, 2004
 Detsl – God Exist (DJ Sender Remix) / Universal, 2004
 ARSDA. – Banda (DJ Sender Bandit Mix) / 2004, ARS, Send
 D.A. – The Light Of The Far Planets (DJ Sender Sky Mix) / 2003
 Tronic Inc. – Beloved (DJ Sender Remix) / 2005, Kitschy UK – Mashtronic
 Granite & Phunk – Switch On (DJ Sender Remix) / 2005, Sureplayer (UK)
 DJ Ralph ‘N’ JO – To The Limit (DJ Sender Remix) / 2005, F*** Me I'm Famous (France)
 High Side – Alive (DJ Sender Remix) [Joachim Garraud] / 2005, France
 Polina Griffith – Justice Of Love (DJ Sender Club Mix) / 2005, Send, EMI (UK)
 Eric Prydz – Call On Me (DJ Sender Vocal Mix, DJ Sender Acid Vibe) / 2005 Send (UA)
 Narcotic Thrust – I Like It (DJ Sender Remix) / 2004 Full House France
 DJ Sender – Torque (Main Vibe, Acid Re-Dub, Treat Brothers Vocal Re-Touch) / Sureplayer Black (UK)
 Operator EP (Operator, Fifth Gear) (Executive (France)
 DJ Sender - What You Need (Original Mix + incl. DJ PROM Remixes) / Sureplayer (Germany, UK)

References

External links 
 sender.ua
 Homepage of Dj Sender
 Sender on promodj.ru
 Sender on TOPDJ.ua
 Personal myspace page
 Channel on YouTube

1984 births
Living people
People from Luhansk
Ukrainian DJs
House musicians
Techno musicians
Ukrainian record producers
Electronic dance music DJs